Hannibal Muammar Gaddafi  (born 20 September 1976) is the fifth son of former Libyan leader Muammar Gaddafi and his second wife, Safia Farkash.

Biography
Gaddafi was born in Tripoli in either 1975 or 1976. He started his maritime career by joining the Marine Academy of Maritime Studies/Libya in 1993 as a Deck Cadet. He graduated in 1999, as a watch keeping officer with a BSc degree in marine navigation.

Soon after he started his maritime career on board various types of GNMTC vessels on various ranks, he obtained successfully the combined chief officer and Master Mariner qualification from the Arab Maritime Academy for Science, Technology and Maritime Transport in Alexandria in 2003.

Gaddafi was the first consultant to the Management Committee of the General National Maritime Transport Company (GNMTC) of Libya. He was appointed to this position in 2007, upon earning his MBA degree in Shipping Economics and Logistics from Copenhagen Business School.

Gaddafi is married to Aline Skaf, a Lebanese Christian former lingerie model, with whom he has three children. Another child, Carthage Hannibal (born 2 August 2008), was killed in the bombing raid of the family compound on 30 April 2011.

Legal issues
In 2008, Swiss authorities arrested Gaddafi and his wife, Aline Skaf, on charges of "bodily harm, threatening behaviour and coercion," after an incident involving two of their staff at the Gaddafis' hotel in Geneva. The charges were later dropped, but relations between Libya and Switzerland soured. In 2009, two Swiss citizens, Max Goeldi and Rachid Hamdani, were detained in Libya; the Swiss government asserted that the detention was done as retaliation against them for Gaddafi's arrest.

Also in 2008, Gaddafi lost a lawsuit he brought in Denmark against the Danish newspaper, Ekstra Bladet. The newspaper reported that in 2005, Gaddafi, then a student in Copenhagen, had directed the abduction and beating of a Libyan national at the home of the Libyan consul in Gentofte. Gaddafi failed to appear in court to present his side of the case, and the court ruled that the existing evidence supported Ekstra Bladet's version of events.

In 2009, police were called to Claridge's Hotel in London in response to reports of a woman screaming. When they arrived, the suite was locked and three bodyguards were arrested for obstructing entry. Gaddafi's wife, Aline Skaf, was found in the room bleeding heavily and was taken by ambulance to hospital where she was treated for facial injuries.

Flight from Libya
On 29 August after the rebels entered Tripoli, Gaddafi and his wife fled from Libya to Algeria together with other members of the Gaddafi family. In October 2012 they left a hideaway in Algeria to go to Oman, where they were granted political asylum. He later moved to Syria with his wife and children.

Shweyga Mullah, an Ethiopian nanny who cared for the couple's young daughter and son was found abandoned by the rebels in a room at one of the family's luxury seaside villas in western Tripoli. She claimed that Aline Skaf took her to a bathroom, tied her up, taped her mouth and started pouring the boiling water on her head after she lost her temper when Mullah refused to beat her daughter who was crying. Then Mullah was denied sleep, food and water for three days. Another member of staff, who did not want to give his name, verified Mullah's story and said that he also had been regularly beaten and slashed with knives.

Captivity in Lebanon
On 11 December 2015, Hannibal was kidnapped and briefly held in Lebanon by an armed group demanding information about disappearance of Shiite Imam Musa al-Sadr,  Sheikh Muhammad Yaacoub, and journalist Abbas Badreddine, but later was released in the city of Baalbek. The armed group was allegedly led by members of Yaacoub's family.

An arrest warrant was issued against him by the Lebanese government over the disappearance of al-Sadr and he was arrested. A request by the Syrian government to return Gaddafi on the grounds that he was a political refugee was denied by the Lebanese government as he is a wanted man in Lebanon for withholding information regarding the disappearance of al-Sadr. In August 2016, al-Sadr's family filed a lawsuit against Gaddafi over his role in the disappearance of the Imam despite the fact that Sadr's disappearance in 1978 occurred when Hannibal was two years old. In 2019, Russia, which developed close ties with Hannibal's older brother Saif al-Islam, allegedly pushed for Hannibal's release and offered him asylum in Moscow.

Hannibal cited his age at the time of the event as proof of his innocence. He also stated that his father Muammar did not meet Sadr in August 1978 as he was in Sirte. Instead, Sadr and his entourage were hosted by Libyan Prime Minister Abdessalam Jalloud in Tripoli. His older brother Saif al-Islam has been negotiating his release behind the scenes through intermediaries, including Lebanese businessman Mohammed Jamil Derbah (a former associate of the late British gangster John Palmer), French-Algerian lobbyist Tayeb Benabderrahmane, and French-Iraqi businessman Souha al-Bedri. Several foreign government, including Turkey, have also lobbied for Hannibal's release, but their efforts are blocked at the highest level by the Shia-dominated Amal Movement and Hezbollah. Several associates of former French President Nicolas Sarkozy, including paparazzi Michèle Marchand and businessman Noël Dubus, were allegedly involved in a plot to free Hannibal in exchange for Hannibal's testimony absolving Sarkozy in the alleged Libyan financing in the 2007 French presidential election scandal. As of November 2022, Hannibal is still in custody in Lebanon. 

While Hannibal is being detained in Lebanon, his wife Aline Skaf lives in Syrian capital Damascus with their children. In January 2021, she was suspected of ramming her car into police and pedestrians in a road rage attack in Damascus.

References

1975 births
People from Tripoli, Libya
Libyan people of Bosnia and Herzegovina descent
Libyan people of Croatian descent
Libyan people of Hungarian descent
Copenhagen Business School alumni
Hannibal Muammar
Libyan businesspeople
Living people
Businesspeople in the oil industry
People of the First Libyan Civil War
Sons of national leaders
Libyan emigrants to Oman